William Ronald "Roy" John (29 January 1911 – 12 July 1973) was a Welsh international footballer who played as a goalkeeper for Manchester United, Newport County, Sheffield United, Stoke City, Swansea Town and Walsall as well as the Wales national team.

Football career
Born in Briton Ferry, John began his career with Briton Ferry Athletic before joining Swansea Town in 1927. At this time he was an outfield player, originally a full-back (where he was "not greatly appreciated") before initially moving forward to play as a half-back, where he gained a reputation as "a resolute tackler with a useful kick". He left Swansea in May 1928, having not played a Football League game for them.

He then joined Walsall, where he played for the reserve side as a half-back. Following the departure of Fred Biddlestone to Aston Villa in January 1930 and an injury to the reserve goalkeeper, manager Sid Scholey asked John to try out for the custodian's shirt. John did so well in a practice match that he was quickly promoted to first-team goalkeeper. Within months he made his international debut, when he played for Wales against Ireland on 22 April 1931. His debut match ended in a 3–2 victory to the Welsh. One writer of the time described him as "dashing and daring – a gay cavalier who laughs fortune in the face".

After 88 league games for Walsall, he was transferred to Stoke City in April 1932, where he was part of the team which won the Football League Second Division title in 1932–33. The local media described John's performances during that season as "simply brilliant". He struggled though in the First Division and was sold to Preston in the summer of 1934. After six months at Preston North End, John moved to Sheffield United in December 1934, for a transfer fee of £1,250. He made 29 League appearances for the Blades, before he was sold to Manchester United in June 1936, for a fee of £600. His debut for the club finished in a 1–1 draw with Wolverhampton Wanderers on 29 August 1936. He transferred to Newport County in March 1937, having made 15 appearances for United.

He moved back to Swansea Town four months after joining Newport. In 1938, he helped Swansea reach the final of the Welsh Cup, where they were defeated by Shrewsbury Town in a replay. He remained at the Vetch Field club until the Second World War cut his career short. He officially retired on 11 November 1939, when he became a hotel manager.

During the war, John guested for several clubs in the north-west of England, including Southport, and in September 1942 he played for a Wales XI against the R.A.F.

International career
John made 14 appearances for Wales in full internationals, helping Wales win the British Home Championship in 1933 and 1934. During his time as the Wales goalkeeper, he alternated with Bert Gray and Len Evans.

Career statistics

Club
Source:

International

Source:

Honours
Stoke City
Football League Second Division champions: 1932–33

Swansea Town
Welsh Cup finalists: 1938

Wales
British Home Championship: 1933, 1934

References

External links
 Profile at StretfordEnd.co.uk
 

1911 births
1973 deaths
Sportspeople from Briton Ferry
Welsh footballers
Wales international footballers
Association football goalkeepers
English Football League players
Swansea City A.F.C. players
Walsall F.C. players
Stoke City F.C. players
Preston North End F.C. players
Sheffield United F.C. players
Manchester United F.C. players
Newport County A.F.C. players
Wales wartime international footballers
Southport F.C. wartime guest players
20th-century Royal Air Force personnel
Briton Ferry Athletic F.C. players